Tropaeolum argentinum is a climbing or scrambling plant from Argentina with yellow feathery flowers. It was introduced to cultivation in 2007 by plant collectors John Watson and Anita Flores Watson.

References

argentinum
Plants described in 1892